Azhar Hasan (born 8 April 1939) is a former Pakistani cricketer and umpire. He stood in one One Day International (ODI) match in 1977.

See also
 List of One Day International cricket umpires

References

External links

1939 births
Living people
Pakistani One Day International cricket umpires
Cricketers from Hoshiarpur
Pakistani cricketers
Lahore cricketers